Elections to Armagh District Council were held on 15 May 1985 on the same day as the other Northern Irish local government elections. The election used four district electoral areas to elect a total of 22 councillors.

Election results

Note: "Votes" are the first preference votes.

Districts summary

|- class="unsortable" align="centre"
!rowspan=2 align="left"|Ward
! % 
!Cllrs
! % 
!Cllrs
! %
!Cllrs
! %
!Cllrs
! % 
!Cllrs
!rowspan=2|TotalCllrs
|- class="unsortable" align="center"
!colspan=2 bgcolor="" | UUP
!colspan=2 bgcolor="" | SDLP
!colspan=2 bgcolor="" | DUP
!colspan=2 bgcolor="" | Sinn Féin
!colspan=2 bgcolor="white"| Others
|-
|align="left"|Armagh City
|bgcolor="40BFF5"|30.4
|bgcolor="40BFF5"|2
|30.3
|2
|12.6
|1
|16.1
|1
|10.6
|0
|6
|-
|align="left"|Crossmore
|30.6
|2
|bgcolor="#99FF66"|58.5
|bgcolor="#99FF66"|3
|10.9
|0
|0.0
|0
|0.0
|0
|5
|-
|align="left"|Cusher
|bgcolor="40BFF5"|60.2
|bgcolor="40BFF5"|4
|17.8
|1
|22.0
|1
|0.0
|0
|0.0
|0
|6
|-
|align="left"|The Orchard
|bgcolor="40BFF5"|48.7
|bgcolor="40BFF5"|3
|21.2
|1
|20.4
|1
|9.7
|0
|0.0
|0
|5
|- class="unsortable" class="sortbottom" style="background:#C9C9C9"
|align="left"| Total
|43.8
|11
|30.1
|7
|17.0
|2
|6.4
|1
|2.7
|0
|22
|-
|}

District results

Armagh City

1985: 2 x SDLP, 2 x UUP, 1 x Sinn Féin, 1 x DUP

Crossmore

1985: 3 x SDLP, 2 x UUP

Cusher

1985: 4 x UUP, 1 x SDLP, 1 x DUP

The Orchard

1985: 3 x UUP, 1 x SDLP, 1 x DUP

References

Armagh City and District Council elections
Armagh